The 1982 season was the second in the history of Wollongong City (now Wollongong Wolves). It was also the second season in the National Soccer League. In addition to the domestic league, they also participated in the NSL Cup. Wollongong City finished 3rd in their National Soccer League season and were eliminated in the Preliminary Final by St George-Budapest, and were eliminated in the NSL Cup first round by Sydney City.

Players

Competitions

Overview

National Soccer League

League table

Results by round

Matches

Finals series

NSL Cup

Statistics

Appearances and goals
Players with no appearances not included in the list.

Clean sheets

References

Wollongong Wolves FC seasons